Tingulli 3nt, also known as Tingulli Trent, is a Kosovo-Albanian hip hop group formed in 1996. The group members are Getoar Selimi and Agon Amiga. His brother "Liberian Selimi" was also active in the rap scene during his teenage years. In the summer of 2010 Tingulli 3nt collaborated with Ermal Fejzullahu, a famous Albanian folk singer. The video of the song was reportedly censured, because of the excessive nudity exposed in the images.

References 

Albanian hip hop groups